Knutstorp Castle is a manor house situated in the Svalöv Municipality of Scania, Sweden.

History
A manor already in the middle of the 14th century, it was owned by the Danish Brahe noble family  from the end of the Middle Ages until 1663, after Scania was ceded to Sweden in the treaty of Roskilde. The main building was completed in 1551 by the Danish Royal Privy Councilor Otte Brahe (1518–1571) and his wife Beate Clausdatter Bille (1526–1605). The estate was the birthplace of their children; the famous astronomer Tycho Brahe (1546–1601) and his astronomer sister Sophia Brahe (1556–1643).
 

The estate was sold in 1771 to the Swedish Count  Fredrik Georg Hans Carl Wachtmeister af Johannishus (1720–1792), and has since belonged to the members of his family.

See also
List of castles in Sweden

References

External links
Knutstorps Borg website

Houses completed in the 16th century
Buildings and structures in Skåne County
16th-century establishments in Skåne County